Amity United Football Club is an Indian professional football club based in Gurgaon, Haryana. Formed in 2005, the club has competed in the I-League 2nd Division till 2012.

History
Amity United was founded in 2005 in Haryana and since has been growing up step by step from district to state to national level. Their first game of I-League 2nd Division was played on 25 March 2008, between Mohammedan Sporting and Amity United.

They have played in the I-League 2nd Division since 2008, but for the 2012 I-League 2nd Division Amity United were denied entry.

Honours
Haryana State Football Championship
Winners (1): 2008–09
Kalinga Cup
Winners (1): 2009
Hot Weather Football Championship
Winners (2): 2006, 2008
Chaturbhuj Memorial Football Tournament
Winners (1): 2008
Gwalior Gold Cup
Winners (1): 2008
Sambalpur Gold Cup
Winners (1): 2009
Mohan Kumar Mangalam Football Tournament
Runners-up (1): 2010

See also
 List of football clubs in India
 DSA Senior Division

References

External links
 Website (archived)

Football clubs in Haryana
Association football clubs established in 2005
2005 establishments in Haryana
Sport in Gurgaon
I-League 2nd Division clubs